The Farol da Ribeira Brava is a small lighthouse on the south coast of the island of Madeira, Portugal. The lighthouse was built in 1930 on top of a promontory at a focal height of 34 metres, located 16 km west of the city of Funchal.

See also

 List of lighthouses in Portugal

References

Lighthouses in Madeira
Lighthouses completed in 1930